Carlene Smith is Jamaica's first Dancehall Queen. She was crowned Dancehall Queen in 1992 after she and her crew competed against well known models in Jamaica. There had been other Dancehall Queens before her but she started the national spotlight on a reign that was usually isolated to the Jamaican garrisons.

Biography
Smith had a longtime relationship and a daughter with popular DJ Beenie Man.

Dance career
Smith can be seen in the 1992 music video for the Chaka Demus & Pliers song Murder She Wrote, wearing a gold outfit and white wig. She was also featured on other music videos before and after her appearance on the Dancehall video "Murder She Wrote".

Smith was also featured in the 1997 edition of Vibes magazine on the bottom of Page 52. Where she was credited for the International Butterfly Dance and explains her endorsement of Slam Condoms.

References 

Living people
Jamaican female dancers
Dancehall dancers
1973 births